Grochowa  is a village in the administrative district of Gmina Piaseczno, within Piaseczno County, Masovian Voivodeship, in the east-central region of Poland.

References

Grochowa